Kesaia Tawai (born  in Levuka) was a Fijian female weightlifter, competing in the 63 kg category and representing Fiji at international competitions. 

She participated at the 2000 Summer Olympics in the 63 kg event. She competed at world championships, most recently at the 1999 World Weightlifting Championships.

Major results

References

External links

 
 http://websites.sportstg.com/assoc_page.cgi?client=7-1995-0-0-0&sID=15318&&news_task=DETAIL&articleID=39734
 http://www.oceaniaweightlifting.com/rankings/docs/2007%20SOUTH%20PACIFIC%20RANKING%20LIST%20(MEN%20&%20WOMEN).pdf

1980 births
Living people
Fijian female weightlifters
Weightlifters at the 2000 Summer Olympics
Olympic weightlifters of Fiji
People from Levuka